The Danish Mathematical Society (Dansk Matematisk Forening) is a society of Danish mathematicians founded in 1873 at the University of Copenhagen, a year after the French Mathematical Society.  According to the society website, it has "the purpose of acting for the benefit of mathematics in research and education."

History 
The society was founded after the idea of Thorvald N. Thiele.  The first committee was composed of Thiele, Hieronymus Georg Zeuthen and Julius Petersen.

Presidents 
 Johan Jensen (1892–1903)
 Vilhelm Herman Oluf Madsen (1903–1910)
 Niels Nielsen (1910–1917)
 Johannes Mollerup (1917–1926)
 Harald Bohr (1926–1929, 1937–1951)
 Børge Jessen (1954–1958)
 Werner Fenchel (1958–1962)
 Bodil Branner (1998–2002)

See also
 List of Mathematical Societies

External links 
 K. Ramskov, The Danish Mathematical Society through 125 Years, Historia Mathematica, 2000.
 The Danish Mathematical Society, English webpage
O'Connor, John J.; Robertson, Edmund F., "Danish Mathematical Society", MacTutor History of Mathematics archive

Mathematical societies
1873 establishments in Denmark